Harisk-e Olya (also Romanized as Harīsk-e ‘Olyā; also known as Harīsk-e Bālā) is a village in Kushk Rural District, in the Central District of Bafq County, Yazd Province, Iran. At the 2006 census, its population was 74, in 20 families.

References 

Populated places in Bafq County